One Night in Istanbul, also known as One Night in Istanbul: The Movie, is a British comedy-drama film, directed by James Marquand and produced/written by Nicky Allt. The film stars Steven Waddington, Paul Barber, Lucien Laviscount, Samantha Womack, and Ingvar Eggert Sigurðsson. It is based on the play of the same name by Nicky Allt.

The film's trailer was revealed on 8 August 2014 and was released on 11 September 2014 exclusively at Odeon Cinemas in the United Kingdom and Ireland. The film was released worldwide on 15 September.

Plot
Two down on their luck Liverpool cabbies, Tommy and Gerry, strike an unusual deal with a local gangster to take their sons on a trip of a lifetime, to watch their beloved football team play in the European Cup Final in Istanbul. Hoping to use the trip as a chance to bond with their sons, big trouble awaits them in the form of a sexy hotel chambermaid, two ruthless crooks on a mission and a bag of counterfeit cash".

Cast
 Steven Waddington as Tommy
 Paul Barber as Gerry
 Lucien Laviscount as Joseph
 Samantha Womack as Carmella Jones
 Gamze Seber as Leyla
 Ingvar Eggert Sigurðsson as Altan
 Mark Womack as Tony Fitz
 Natasha Jones as Tia Edwards

Release
The premiere was held on 10 September 2014 at the Odeon Cinema in Liverpool One and was attended by Steven Gerrard and Jamie Carragher alongside more Liverpool players. The film went on general release in the UK on 11 September. The film was released in the UK on DVD on 2 February 2015.

References

External links 

 
 
 
 
 Official trailer

2014 films
2010s sports comedy-drama films
Liverpool F.C.
British sports comedy-drama films
British association football films
Films set in the 2000s
Films set in 2005
Films set in Liverpool
Films set in Istanbul
Films shot in Merseyside
Films shot in Istanbul
British films based on plays
2010s English-language films
2010s British films